The Pit FM was a 24/7 Australian Internet radio station based in Perth, Western Australia, that specialised in punk, hardcore punk, post-hardcore, heavy metal and alternative rock music.

History
The Pit FM was started in an apartment in Northbridge by a group of Australian "punks" and "metalheads". The station moved from Northbridge to Midland in late 2011 to expand its on-site operations, offering a variety of genre-specific request and news programmes directed at the local punk community and listeners on the Internet.

The Pit FM also played an integral part in promoting both the Never Say Die Suicide Prevention Fundraiser and the East Africa Fundraising Gig. It was listed as an ally of Mannequin Republic and a member of Euromusic.

On 2 September 2012, the PitFM ceased broadcasting.

The Pit FM crew

Presenters 
Kevin Bastien (Quebec, Canada)
Blake Heldt
Trent Brand
Paul Macfarlan
Daniel Cribb
Pat Decline
Colin Dickie
James Fox (United Kingdom)
James Gamble
Jacob Impson
Kyle Jones
 Brett Jones
 Lewis Jones
Tahnee Graham
Nicholas Daniel
Ryan Ferguson
Jacob McDermott
Daniel Molloy
Kieran Molloy
Jake Leaudais
Mitchell Paton
Pauly Righini
Don Ruphard (Illinois, United States)
William Silva
Phil Smith
Andy Storey
James Thurlby (United Kingdom)
Tom Watts
Matt Williams
Josh Murphy Muir

Programming
The Pit FM followed an organised broadcast schedule, with each show having its own hosts, genre or theme, and a regular air-time.

New bands could send their music to the station to be played on-air. There were also pieces by well-known acts played at The Pit FM.

Listenership/audience demographic
By the end of 2011, The Pit FM peaked at 100,000 listeners for the week. Before its closure in September, The Pit FM stated it was broadcasting to 250,000.

News and interviews
The Pit published on-air interviews with Four Year Strong, In This Moment, Eskimo Callboy, Overkill, Six Feet Under, Alesana, Wednesday 13, Steel Panther, Before The Murder, You Me at Six, Saves the Day, Casino Madrid, A Traitor Among Us, Athena's Grace and Chunk, No Captain Chunk!.

The Pit also had interviews with music heavy-weights like Zakk Wylde, Parkway Drive, Anaal Nathrakh, Every Time I Die, Origin, and more before it ceased operations.

References

External links

Radio stations in Perth, Western Australia
Internet radio stations in Australia
Radio stations established in 2011
Radio stations disestablished in 2012
Defunct radio stations in Australia